Abdulino is a town in Orenburg Oblast, Russia. As of the 2010 Census, its population was 20,173.

Administrative and municipal status
Within the framework of administrative divisions, Abdulino serves as the administrative center of Abdulinsky District, even though it is not a part of it. As an administrative division, it is incorporated separately as the Town of Abdulino—an administrative unit with the status equal to that of the districts. As a municipal division, the territories of the Town of Abdulino and of Abdulinsky District are incorporated as Abdulinsky Urban Okrug.

References

Notes

Sources

External links
Official website of Abdulino 
Directory of organizations in Abdulino 

Cities and towns in Orenburg Oblast
Buguruslansky Uyezd
